Manoranjan Byapari is an Indian Bengali writer, socio-political activist and a politician. He is among the early writers of Dalit literature in Bengali from the Indian state of West Bengal. He could not afford any formal education and is perhaps the only convict-turned-Rickshaw puller who has penned a dozen novels and over a hundred short stories, apart from non-fiction essays. He was elected as an MLA, from the Balagarh (Vidhan Sabha constituency) in 2021 West Bengal Legislative Assembly election. He won the 2022 Shakti Bhatt Book Prize.

Early life 
Byapari was born into Namasudra caste at Barisal in Bangladesh. His family migrated to West Bengal when he was three years old. The family was first resettled in Bankura, Shiromanipur Refugee camp. Later they were forced to move to Ghutiyari Sharif, Gholadoltala Refugee Camp, South 24 Paraganas and they lived there until 1969. However, the young Byapari had left his home at the age of fourteen and undertook a number of low-paid informal sector jobs in various cities in Assam, Lucknow, Delhi and Allahabad. After spending two years in Dandakaranya, he shifted to Kolkata in 1973. He had a brief stint with the Naxals in central India. It was during his prison term, he educated himself to read. He was closely associated with the famous labour activist Shankar Guha Niyogi.

Political career 
He has been elected as an M.L.A. from Balagarh Assembly Constituency representing the All India Trinamool Congress (AITC) in the West Bengal Legislative Assembly Elections 2021.

Life as an author 
He came to prominence with the publication of his influential essay Is there a Dalit writing in Bangla?, translated by Meenakshi Mukherjee, in the journal Economic and Political Weekly. While working as a rickshaw puller, he had a chance meeting with Mahasweta Devi, and she asked him to write for her 'Bartika' journal.

He has pointed out that the upper Caste refugees from East Bengal are given preferential treatment while being resettled in Kolkata, as favoured by the Upper Caste officials in the West Bengal.

Rajya Sabha TV has made a documentary on his life.

In 2022, he won the Shakti Bhatt Prize.

Books 
He wrote a memoir ইতিবৃত্তে চণ্ডাল জীবন in Bengali, translated into English by Sipra Mukherjee as Interrogating my Chandal life: An Autobiography of a Dalit (Sage-Samya)   which won The Hindu Prize. The book records the experiences of oppression and marginalisation that Dalits face in Bengal which is otherwise known as a 'casteless society', as claimed by many a bhadralok. Being a Dalit is central to his writing. As he says, "I’m a Dalit by birth. Only a dalit, oppressed by social forces can experience true dalan (oppression) in life. There should be that dalan as a dalit in Dalit writing. Dalit literature should be based on dalit life. Some of my writings deal with dalit life; some to be judged neutrally, without any preconceived estimation". He says he is a chandal in two ways, by birth and by rage (krodha chandal).

Award 
In 2014 he was honoured with Suprabha Majumdar prize awarded by Paschimbanga Bangla Akademi. He received the Sharmila Ghosh Smriti Literary prize in 2015. The translation of his autobiography Interrogating My Chandal Life won the 2019 The Hindu Literary Prize in non-fiction.

References

Living people
Bengali-language writers
Dalit writers
20th-century Indian male writers
Year of birth missing (living people)
People from Barisal District
West Bengal MLAs 2021–2026
Trinamool Congress politicians from West Bengal
20th-century Indian novelists
Writers from West Bengal